Khalil Allah or Khalilullah is an Arabic name, usually associated with Abraham. It can also refer to:

 Khalilullah I (d. 1465), King of Shirvan
 Khalilullah II (d. 1535), King of Shirvan
 Khalil Allah I (d. 1634), 37th Nizari imam
 Khalil Allah II Ali (d. 1680), 39th Nizari imam
 Shah Khalil Allah III (d. 1817), 45th Nizari imam
 Khalilullah Khalili (1907–1987), Afghan poet
 Khalil Ullah Khan (1934–2014), Bangladeshi actor
 Khalilullah (cricketer) (b. 1993), Pakistani cricketer

See also
 Khalil (name)
 Khalil-ur-Rehman (disambiguation)

Arabic given names
Theophoric names